A Bird of the Air is a 2011 American romantic drama film directed by Margaret Whitton and starring Rachel Nichols and Jackson Hurst.  It is based on the novel The Loop by Joe Coomer.

Synopsis 
Lyman is a highway worker who spends most of his days barely speaking due to his shyness and a past trauma. This changes when he encounters a parrot owned by Fiona, a peppy librarian that takes an immediate interest in him.

Cast
Jackson Hurst as Lyman
Rachel Nichols as Fiona
Linda Emond as Margie
Buck Henry as Duncan Weber
Judith Ivey as Eleanor Reeves
Gary Farmer as Charles Ballard
Genia Michaela as Amber
Anjanette Comer as Mrs. Weber
Phyllis Somerville as Ivy Campbell
Erik Jensen as Bearded Man
Matte Osian as Trucker
Rocco Sisto as Security Guard
Louis Zorich as Stowalski

Development 
Plans to adapt Joe Coomer's novel The Loop were first announced in 2009, under the working title of The Loop. Rachel Nichols and Jackson Hurst were announced to perform as the two leads and would work from a script written by Roger Towne. Filming took place in New Mexico and Hurst's scenes were performed while he was on hiatus from the show Drop Dead Diva.

Release
The film was released in limited theaters on September 23, 2011.  It was then released on DVD, VOD and digital platforms on April 10, 2012.

Reception
The film has  rating on Rotten Tomatoes.  Andrew Schenker of Slant Magazine awarded the film one and a half stars out of four. Jeannette Catsoulis of The New York Times was critical of the movie, as she felt that the two leads "display more chemistry with the film’s fauna than with each other."

References

External links
 
 
 

2011 romantic drama films
2011 films
American romantic drama films
Films based on American novels
2010s English-language films
2010s American films